Timiskaming was a provincial electoral district in Ontario, Canada, that was represented in the Legislative Assembly of Ontario from 1908 to 1999. It encompassed most of the Timiskaming District.

For the 1999 election, in which all electoral districts in the province were realigned to match their federal counterparts, Timiskaming was merged with part of Cochrane South into the new district of Timiskaming—Cochrane.

Representation

This riding has elected the following members of the Legislative Assembly of Ontario:

Former provincial electoral districts of Ontario